Donny Grant Zamora (born 12 April 1976) is a Costa Rican former football player.

Club career
A goalkeeper, Grant started his career in 1998 at Limonense and moved abroad to join Salvadoran side FAS in summer 2001. He left them for Santos de Guápiles in February 2002 only to join Pérez Zeledón after half a season. He later played for Cartaginés and San Carlos, where he forced his way out in summer 2011 to sign for Saprissa.

International career
He made his debut for Costa Rica in a February 2005 UNCAF Nations Cup match against Panama and earned a total of 8 caps, scoring no goals. He represented his country at the 2005 and 2011 UNCAF Nations Cups. He was a non-playing squad member at both the 2005 and 2011 CONCACAF Gold Cup.

His final international was a December 2011 friendly match against Cuba.

References

External links
Player profile - Saprissa
Football Database Profile

Living people
1976 births
People from Limón Province
Association football goalkeepers
Costa Rican footballers
Costa Rica international footballers
2005 UNCAF Nations Cup players
2005 CONCACAF Gold Cup players
2011 Copa Centroamericana players
2011 CONCACAF Gold Cup players
Santos de Guápiles footballers
C.D. FAS footballers
Municipal Pérez Zeledón footballers
C.S. Cartaginés players
A.D. San Carlos footballers
Deportivo Saprissa players
Costa Rican expatriate footballers
Expatriate footballers in El Salvador
Copa Centroamericana-winning players